Tevita ‘Tex’ Cavubati (born 12 August 1987) is a Fijian Rugby Union player who currently plays as a lock for Harlequins in the Premiership and for Fiji.

Club career
Cavubati comes from a strong rugby family, with brother Bill turning out as a prop for Wellington in the ITM Cup and playing 38 tests for Fiji.  His first chance in rugby came when he played for Spotswood United in New Zealand, between 2008 and 2010, however despite gaining good competitive experience here he was never able to make the ITM Cup side of his local union, .   After a short spell back in his native Fiji he returned to New Zealand ahead of the 2012 ITM Cup this time earning a contract with the Tasman Makos.   He has since become an established member of the Makos side and helped them to reach the Premiership final in 2014.

After playing for Welsh region Ospreys in the Pro14, as of 16 September 2015, Cavubati signed for English club Worcester Warriors from the 2015–16 season.

On 2 May 2017, Cavubati signed for Premiership rivals Newcastle Falcons from the 2017-18 Premiership campaign.

After sustaining an injury to his right leg which kept him out of the game for five months, he returned to the field for Newcastle Falcons in an A-League game against Bath. He signed for Harlequins in July 2019, joining the club after the 2019 Rugby World Cup.

On 3 July 2019, Cavubati signed for Premiership rivals Harlequins from the 2019-20 season.

On 11 July 2021, Cavubati makes his move to France as he signed for Perpignan in the Top 14 competition ahead of the 2021-22 season.

International career
Cavubati received his first senior cap for Fiji in a match against  in July 2011 and had to wait another 3 years before adding to his cap tally.

Personal life
Tevita is the creator of the phrase ”Suvababy”, Combining his birthplace, Suva with the word ‘Baby’. He stated the phrase “Symbolises Warmth, Good Vibes and Happiness” and “Is a reminder of home”. It is used by rugby players, most often Pacific Islander’s, to express how they feel. Cavubati then used the phrase as a name for his clothing brand Suvababy Clothing from which he currently sells SnapBack Caps.

References

External links 
 

1987 births
Living people
Fijian rugby union players
Fiji international rugby union players
Rugby union locks
Tasman rugby union players
Ospreys (rugby union) players
Worcester Warriors players
Newcastle Falcons players
Harlequin F.C. players
Sportspeople from Suva
Fijian expatriate rugby union players
Fijian expatriate sportspeople in New Zealand
Fijian expatriate sportspeople in England
Expatriate rugby union players in New Zealand
Expatriate rugby union players in Wales
I-Taukei Fijian people
USA Perpignan players